Ramnagar Bhutaha   is a village development committee in Sunsari District in the Kosi Zone of south-eastern Nepal. At the time of the 1991 Nepal census, it had a population of 8003 in 1325 individual households.

References

Populated places in Sunsari District